Stuart M. Kaminsky (September 29, 1934 – October 9, 2009) was an American mystery writer and film professor. He is known for three long-running series of mystery novels featuring the protagonists Toby Peters, a private detective in 1940s Hollywood (1977-2004); Inspector Porfiry Petrovich Rostnikov, a Moscow police inspector (1981-2010); and veteran Chicago police officer Abe Lieberman (1990-2007). There is also a fourth series featuring a Sarasota, Florida, process server named Lew Fonesca (1999-2009).

Kaminsky's Inspector Rostnikov novel A Cold Red Sunrise received the 1989 Edgar Award for Best Novel. He earned six other Edgar nominations, most recently for the 2005 non-fiction book Behind the Mystery: Top Mystery Writers Interviewed, which was also nominated for an Anthony Award, a Macavity Award, and an Agatha Award. In 2006 Kaminsky received the Grand Master Award from the Mystery Writers of America. Kaminsky wrote sixty-three novels and eleven non-fiction books in addition to various other works such as short story collections, graphic novels, screenplays, television scripts and theatrical plays.

Life and career
Kaminsky, who grew up in Chicago, earned a B.S. in journalism and an M.A. in English from the University of Illinois and a Ph.D. in speech from Northwestern University. He taught film studies at Northwestern for 16 years, and then taught at Florida State for six years.

Kaminsky's first novel was the 1977 Toby Peters mystery Bullet for a Starcreating the protagonist's name from a blend of his sons' names: Toby and Peter. He went on to write over sixty novels, as well as story collections and nonfiction works. Kaminsky was a past president of the Mystery Writers of America.

Besides being one of America's most prolific mystery writers, Kaminsky inspired many other writers in the genre, including fellow Chicagoan Sara Paretsky, who dedicated the first novel in her V. I. Warshawski private-eye series to Kaminsky.

Death
Kaminsky and his wife, Enid Perll, moved to St. Louis, Missouri in March 2009 to await a liver transplant to treat the hepatitis he contracted as an army medic in the late 1950s in France. He suffered a stroke two days after their arrival in St. Louis, which made him ineligible for a transplant. He died on October 9, 2009.

Works

Novels

Story collections
 Hidden and Other Stories (1999)
 The Man Who Beat the System and Other Stories (Audio) (2000)

Other fiction
 Kolchak: The Night Stalker
 Fever Pitch (graphic novel, with Christopher Jones and Barbara Schulz) (2003)
 Kolchak the Night Stalker, Volume 1 (graphic novel, with Joe Gentile and Jeff Rice) (2004)
 Kolchak: The Night Stalker Chronicles (story anthology, includes "The Night Talker" by Kaminsky) (2005)

As editor
 Opening Shots (1991)
 Mystery in the Sunshine State (1999)
 Show Business Is Murder (2004)
 On a Raven's Wing: New Tales in Honor of Edgar Allan Poe (2009)

Non-fiction
 A Biographical Study of the Career of Donald Siegel and an Analysis of His Films (1972)
 Clint Eastwood (1974)
 American Film Genres: Approaches to a Critical Theory of Popular Film (1974)
 Don Siegel, Director (1974)
 Ingmar Bergman: Essays in Criticism (1975)
 John Huston: Maker of Magic (1978)
 Coop: The Life and Legend of Gary Cooper (1979)
 Basic Filmmaking (with Dana H Hodgdon) (1981)
 Writing for Television (with Mark Walker) (1988)
 American Television Genres (1991)
 Behind the Mystery: Top Mystery Writers Interviewed (Interviews by Kaminsky; photographs by Laurie Roberts) (2005)

Filmography
 Once Upon a Time in America (1984)
 Enemy Territory (1987)
 Fréquence meurtre (1988)
 Woman in the Wind (1990)
 Hidden Fears (1993)
 A Nero Wolfe Mystery — "Immune to Murder" (2002)

Plays
 The Final Toast (2008)
 Books (2009)

References

External links
 
 
  (2008)
 Stuart M. Kaminsky Mysteries website video teaser
 "Stuart M. Kaminsky, Mystery Writer, Dies at 75"; The New York Times, October 13, 2009
 

1934 births
2009 deaths
American mystery writers
20th-century American novelists
American male screenwriters
Deaths from hepatitis
Edgar Award winners
Florida State University faculty
Northwestern University School of Communication alumni
Northwestern University faculty
University of Illinois Urbana-Champaign College of Media alumni
Writers from Chicago
Novelists from Florida
Shamus Award winners
21st-century American novelists
American male novelists
20th-century American male writers
21st-century American male writers
Novelists from Illinois
20th-century American non-fiction writers
21st-century American non-fiction writers
American male non-fiction writers
Screenwriters from Illinois
Screenwriters from Florida
20th-century American screenwriters